The Higher Ground Project was a worldwide campaign to celebrate the lives of children who survived the tsunami resulting from the 2004 Indian Ocean earthquake.

At its heart was an anthology of short stories, Higher Ground (ed Anuj Goyal), written by sixteen  best-selling children's authors, including Michael Morpurgo, Steve Voake and Eoin Colfer, and based on children who survived the tsunami. There was also an audiobook version of the anthology, with dramatised readings of these stories by Val Kilmer, James Nesbitt, Meera Syal, Sean Bean, Stephen Fry and Dawn French, amongst others, with music by Nitin Sawhney.

The Project was organised in aid of UNICEF, Save the Children, Handicap International, Y Care International and SOS Children. Online educational resources were also built for teachers in schools and colleges.

Soft-launched at the Cheltenham Festival, the Project was more later formally launched at the Woburn Gallery in London. Published by Chrysalis Children's Books, the book and CD sold out of its first print-run within the first month of publication, leading to a second run. Former United States President and United Nations Envoy for Tsunami Recovery Bill Clinton sent his best wishes in recognition of the project.

2004 Indian Ocean earthquake and tsunami